Arenberg, also spelled as Aremberg or Ahremberg, is a former county, principality and finally duchy that was located in what is now Germany. The Dukes of Arenberg remain a prominent Belgian noble family.

History 
First mentioned in the 12th century, it was named after the village of Aremberg in the Ahr Hills, located in today's Rhineland-Palatinate region of Germany.

1549–1645
Aremberg was originally a county. It became a state of the Holy Roman Empire (reichsunmittelbar) in 1549, was raised to a princely county in 1576, then became a duchy in 1645.

1789
The territorial possessions of the Dukes of Arenberg varied through the ages. Around 1789, the duchy was located in the Eifel region on the west side of the Rhine and contained, amongst others, Aremberg, Schleiden and Kerpen.

However, although the duchy itself was in Germany, from the 15th century onward, the principal lands of the Dukes of Arenberg have been in what is now Belgium.

The pre-Napoleonic duchy had an area of 413 km² and a population of 14,800. It belonged to the Electoral Rhenish Circle and was bordered by the duchy of Jülich, the Archbishopric of Cologne, the Archbishopric of Trier, and the county of Blankenheim.

1798
After the French occupation of the west bank of the Rhine around 1798 (see Treaty of Campo Formio and Treaty of Lunéville), the Duke of Arenberg received new lands: the county of Vest Recklinghausen, the county of Meppen, and the lordship of Dülmen.

1810
Arenberg joined Napoleon's Confederation of the Rhine, although that did not prevent it from being mediatised in 1810, with France annexing Dülmen and Meppen, and the duchy of Berg annexing Recklinghausen.

1814
After Napoleon's defeat in 1814 and the dissolution of the Confederation of the Rhine, the former Arenberg territories were divided between the kingdom of Prussia and the kingdom of Hanover. In both Prussia and Hanover, the dukes became local peers subordinate to the king.

1826
In 1826, the Arenberg territory in Hanover was named the duchy of Arenberg-Meppen, and it had an area of 2,195 km² and a population of  56,700. The county of Recklinghausen, in Prussia, had an area of 780 km² and a population of 64,700.

The Dukes of Arenberg remain a prominent Belgian aristocratic family. The immediate family members of the dukes are called by the nominal title of Prince of Arenberg. The ducal family descends agnatically from the House of Ligne.

The Forest of Arenberg is located in northeastern France, and it is famous for its cobbled roads used in the classic road cycle race Paris–Roubaix. Its areas saw extensive mining in the past.

Counts, Princely Counts and Dukes

Counts of Arenberg (1117–1576) 

 Franko (1117–1129)
 Henry I (1129–1187)
 Eberhard I (1188–1202)
 Eberhard II  (1202–1229)
 Henry II (1220–1250)
 Gerard (1252–1260)
 John I (1260–1279)
 Mathilde (1282–1299)
 Eberhard (Count of Marck) (1282–1308)
 Engelbert II (1308–1328)
 Eberhard I (III) (1328–1387)
 Eberhard II (1387–1454)
Partition into Arenberg and Rochefort
 John II (1454–1480)
 Eberhard III (1480–1496)
 Eberhard IV (1496–1531)
 Robert I (1531–1541)
 Robert II (?–1536)
 Robert III (1541–1544)
 Margaret (1544–1576)
 John III (1547–1568)
 Charles (1568–1576)

Princely Counts of Arenberg (1576–1645) 

 Margaret (1576–1596) with Jean de Ligne
 Charles (1576–1616)
 Philip Charles (1616–1640)
 Philip Francis (1640–1645)

Dukes of Arenberg (1645–1810) 

 Philippe François, 1st Duke of Arenberg (1645–1675)
 Charles Eugene, 2nd Duke of Arenberg (1675–1681)
 Philip Charles Francis, 3rd Duke of Arenberg (1681–1691)
 Leopold, 4th Duke of Arenberg (1691–1754)
 Charles Marie Raymond, 5th Duke of Arenberg (1754–1778)
 Louis Engelbert, 6th Duke of Arenberg (1778–1803)
 Prosper Louis, 7th  Duke of Arenberg (1803–1810)
Mediatised 1810

See also
 Arenberg-Nordkirchen
 Arenberg Research-Park

References

Sources
 Official site of the House of Arenberg
 The dukes of Arenberg
 Meyers Konversationslexikon

External links
  This has a detailed account of the inheritance of the noble titles from the 13th century onward.
 Map of Luxembourg and the Duchy of Arenberg in 1789

1549 establishments in the Holy Roman Empire
1810 disestablishments in Europe
States and territories established in 1549
House of Ligne
States of the Confederation of the Rhine
Electoral Rhenish Circle
History of the Eifel
 
Counties of the Holy Roman Empire
Duchies of the Holy Roman Empire